Michael Peter Wilhelm is an American basketball coach, currently serving as an advance scout for the NBA's Chicago Bulls. He has also coached in Sweden and in the WNBA and has held scouting positions with the Cleveland Cavaliers and Denver Nuggets.

Wilhelm, a Cleveland native, graduated from  Saint Ignatius High School in Cleveland in 1985, then attended Worcester Academy for a year before entering Southampton College, where he played basketball from 1986 to 1990. He has a wife named Annika, and two children named Max and Isabella.

References

External links
NBA.com Profile

1960s births
Living people
American expatriate basketball people in Sweden
American men's basketball coaches
American women's basketball coaches
Basketball coaches from Ohio
Basketball players from Cleveland
Chicago Bulls assistant coaches
Cleveland Rockers coaches
College men's basketball players in the United States
Haverford Fords men's basketball coaches
Ohio University alumni
Sportspeople from Cleveland
Southampton College alumni
American men's basketball players